Mary Kay Andrews (born July 27, 1954) is the pen name of American writer Kathy Hogan Trocheck, based in Savannah, Georgia, who has authored a number of best-selling books under the Andrews pen name since 2002.

Trochek graduated from the University of Georgia with a journalism degree in 1976.  She worked as a reporter at a number of papers, and spent 11 years as a reporter for the Atlanta Journal-Constitution before leaving to write fiction full-time in 1991.  She published ten mystery novels under her own name between 1992 and 2000, and switched to the Andrews pen name in 2002 to author Savannah Blues, which marked a change in her style to more Southern-flavored themes. Her pen name is inspired by the names of her children, Mary Kathleen and Andrew Trocheck.

Bibliography

Writing as Kathy Hogan Trocheck
 Every Crooked Nanny  (1992) (Callahan Garrity main character)
 To Live and Die in Dixie (1993) (Garrity)
 Homemade Sin (1994) (Garrity)
 Happy Never After (1995) (Garrity)
 Heart Trouble (1996) (Garrity)
 Lickety Split (1996) (Truman Kicklighter main character)
 Strange Brew (1997) (Garrity)
 Crash Course (1997) (Kicklighter)
 Midnight Clear (1998) (Garrity)
 Irish Eyes (2000)

Writing as Mary Kay Andrews
 Savannah Blues (2002)
 Little Bitty Lies (2003)
 Hissy Fit (2004)
 Savannah Breeze (2006)
 Blue Christmas (2006) 
 Deep Dish (2008)
 The Fixer Upper (2009)
 Summer Rental (2011)
 Spring Fever (2012)
 Ladies' Night (2013)
 Christmas Bliss (2013)
 Save the Date (2014)
 Beach Town (2015)
 The Weekenders (2016)
 The High Tide Club (2018)
Sunset Beach (2019)
Hello, Summer (2020)
The Newcomer (2021)
The Santa Suit (2021)
The Homewreckers (2022)

References

External links
Official website - marykayandrews.com

1954 births
Living people
20th-century American novelists
American women novelists
American chick lit writers
University of Georgia alumni
Place of birth missing (living people)
21st-century American novelists
20th-century American women writers
21st-century American women writers
American women journalists
Women mystery writers
20th-century American non-fiction writers
21st-century American non-fiction writers
Pseudonymous women writers
20th-century pseudonymous writers
21st-century pseudonymous writers